Knockacarracoush or Knockacarracoosh is a small townland situated in north County Cork, Ireland, west of Kanturk and north of Millstreet. It is in the parish of Dromtarriff and also borders the parishes of Cullen and Boherbue. It has 14 inhabitants and consists of three farms and four houses.

Archaeology
Archaeological sites include four ringforts and two souterrains.

See also
 List of townlands of the Barony of Duhallow

References

Townlands of County Cork